Warrior caste may refer to;

Historical 
 Kshatriya, a member of the military or reigning order, the second-ranking caste of the Indian varna system 
 Samoa's Toa class in the Fa'amatai system, which used a warrior code known as fa'aaloalo (respect) that is still in existence today;
 Szlachta
 Knights
 Spartiate
 Samurai caste
 Eso Ikoyi, war chiefs amongst the Yoruba people
 Jaguar warriors
 Gallowglass
 Maryannu
 Janissary
 Gurkha
 Praetorian Guard

Fictional
 Minbari Warrior Caste, in the fictional Babylon 5 universe, the Warrior Caste is one of three castes in Minbari society

See also
 Caste
 Social class
 Social stratification
 Warrior code